Climate change and agriculture are complexly related processes. In the United States, agriculture is the second largest emitter of greenhouse gases (GHG), behind the energy sector. Direct GHG emissions from the agricultural sector account for 8.4% of total U.S. emissions, but the loss of soil organic carbon through soil erosion indirectly contributes to emissions as well. While agriculture plays a role in propelling climate change, it is also affected by the direct (increase in temperature, change in rainfall, flooding, drought) and secondary (weed, pest, disease pressure, infrastructure damage) consequences of climate change. USDA research indicates that these climatic changes will lead to a decline in yield and nutrient density in key crops, as well as decreased livestock productivity. Climate change poses unprecedented challenges to U.S. agriculture due to the sensitivity of agricultural productivity and costs to changing climate conditions. Rural communities dependent on agriculture are particularly vulnerable to climate change threats.

The US Global Change Research Program (2017) identified four key areas of concern in the agriculture sector: reduced productivity, degradation of resources, health challenges for people and livestock, and the adaptive capacity of agriculture communities.

Large-scale adaptation and mitigation of these threats relies on changes in farming policy.

Livestock and crop production systems 

Projections for crops and livestock production systems reveal that climate change effects over the next 25 years will be mixed. The continued degree of change in the climate by midcentury and beyond is expected to have overall detrimental effects on most crops and livestock. Climate change will exacerbate current biotic stresses on agricultural plants and animals. Increases of atmospheric carbon dioxide, rising temperatures, and altered precipitation patterns will affect agricultural productivity. Increases in temperature coupled with more variable precipitation will reduce productivity of crops, and these effects will outweigh the benefits of increasing carbon dioxide. Effects will vary among annual and perennial crops, and regions of the United States; however, all production systems will be affected to some degree by climate change.

Livestock production systems are vulnerable to temperature stresses. An animal's ability to adjust its metabolic rate to cope with temperature extremes can lead to reduced productivity and in extreme cases death. Prolonged exposure to extreme temperatures will also further increase production costs and productivity losses associated with all animal products, e.g., meat, eggs, and milk. Grazing lands used for rearing livestock are under increased threats of wildfire.

Soil carbon will be depleted during droughts, depriving crops of an essential element of productivity. In 2012, the US experienced a drought that greatly reduced yield of key crops and livestock in the Great Plans and Midwest region. Average yields of commodity crops (corn, soybean, rice) will decline due to the increased temperature whereas other crops (wheat, hay) could potentially increase yield due to anticipated rainfall in certain regions. Effects on horticulture crops will be variable.

The Southwest region of the United States is one of the hottest and driest regions in the country. Farmers have identified surface and groundwater shortages as being the cause of diminished crop yields. Climate models indicate the likelihood of a decade-scale drought is incredibly high, posing unprecedented stress to the agro-ecosystem.

Weeds, diseases, pests and pollinators 

Changing pressures associated with weeds, diseases, and insect pests, together with potential changes in timing and coincidence of pollinator lifecycles, will affect growth and yields. The potential magnitude of these effects is not yet well understood. For example, while some pest insects will thrive under increasing air temperatures, warming temperatures may force others out of their current geographical ranges. Increased global temperature in similar landscapes restricts agricultural opportunities for sustainable pollination patterns, decreases agricultural movement into habitable areas, and reduces climate buffering during environmental threats. Several weeds have shown a greater response to carbon dioxide relative to crops; understanding these physiological and genetic responses may help guide future enhancements to weed management.

Soil and water impacts 
Agriculture is dependent on a wide range of ecosystem processes that support productivity including maintenance of soil quality and regulation of water quality and quantity. Multiple stressors, including climate change, increasingly compromise the ability of ecosystems to provide these services.

Key near-term climate change effects on agricultural soil and water resources include the potential for increased soil erosion through extreme precipitation events, as well as regional and seasonal changes in the availability of water resources for both rain-fed and irrigated agriculture. Agricultural systems depend upon reliable water sources, and the pattern and potential magnitude of precipitation changes is not well understood, thus adding considerable uncertainty to assessment efforts.

A regional climate model estimated that California will experience increased heavy precipitation events and change in the form of precipitation (predominantly rain as opposed to snow). Changes in the water management system will be essential for preventing water scarcity and reducing stress on the agricultural system.

Extreme weather 
The predicted higher incidence of extreme weather events will have an increasing influence on agricultural productivity. Extremes matter because agricultural productivity is driven largely by environmental conditions during critical threshold periods of crop and livestock development. Improved assessment of climate change effects on agricultural productivity requires greater integration of extreme events into crop and economic models.

Changes in precipitation patterns can cause dry periods to lengthen and rain to become heavier, even in the same area. On one hand, there is an increase in flooding, which can destroy crops and livestock, pollute water, and damage infrastructure. On the other hand, drought can impact the water supply and increase the risk of wildfires.

Human impact on agricultural vulnerability 
The vulnerability of agriculture to climatic change is strongly dependent on the responses taken by humans to moderate the effects of climate change.

Changes in crop and livestock viability are forcing the farmers to find better choices of crops and animals, capable of adaption to temperature changes and water availability. This means farmers are obliged to make new investments and re-learn new practices. And as the farmers are coping with the new transformations, they are facing new threats such as diseases, pets, insects.

Role of the US Department of Agriculture 
A  "USDA Science Blueprint" released in February 2020 focuses on areas from "soil health to weather impacts on agriculture to data collection, and specifically mentions climate change."

A leader at the Union of Concerned Scientists commented, "It is refreshing to see the USDA under Secretary Perdue—who has previously denied the reality of climate change—acknowledging that agriculture is a contributor to climate change, can also be part of the solution, and must adapt in any case."

Concerns remain regarding the cuts to USDA's scientific funding, and the loss of scientific capacity resulting from the decision to move the Economic Research Service (ERS)  and the National Institute of Food and Agriculture (NIFA) away from the Washington DC region.

It is unclear how the plan will impact efforts to involve farmers in the process of carbon sequestration.

See also 

 Climate change in the United States

References 

Climate change and agriculture